Edwin Einstein (November 18, 1842 – January 24, 1905) was an American politician and a U.S. Representative from New York.

Biography
Born in Cincinnati, Ohio, Einstein was son of Lamle 'Lewis' and Judith Einstein. He moved with his parents to New York City in 1846, worked as clerk in a store, and received a collegiate training in the College of the City of New York. He entered Union College, but did not graduate, and continued in mercantile pursuits. He married Fanny Hendricks. He went into a partnership with Louis Hirschhorn founding a cigar manufacturing business named Hirschhorn & Einstein.

Career
Einstein was elected as a Republican to the Forty-sixth Congress, and served from March 4, 1879 to March 3, 1881. Not a candidate for renomination in 1880, he was an unsuccessful Republican candidate for mayor of New York City in 1892.

President of New River Mineral Company, Einstein was also director of Alabama Mineral Land Company, director of Raritan Woolen Mills, and trustee of Texas Pacific Land Trust. He was also Dock Commissioner of New York City in 1895.

Death
Einstein died of heart trouble, in Manhattan, New York County, New York, on January 24, 1905 (age 62 years, 67 days). He is interred at Beth Olom Cemetery, Glendale, Queens, New York.

See also

List of Jewish members of the United States Congress

References

External links

1842 births
1905 deaths
Burials at Beth Olom Cemetery
City College of New York alumni
Jewish American people in New York (state) politics
Jewish members of the United States House of Representatives
Politicians from Cincinnati
Politicians from New York City
Republican Party members of the United States House of Representatives from New York (state)
Union College (New York) alumni
19th-century American politicians